McCullagh is a surname. Notable people with the surname include:

Colm McCullagh, Gaelic Football player for County Tyrone
Crawford McCullagh (1868–1948), Unionist politician in Northern Ireland
David McCullagh, Irish journalist and author
Declan McCullagh, American journalist and columnist for CBSNews.com
Edward McCullagh (1912–1986), nationalist politician and farmer in Northern Ireland

Francis McCullagh (1874–1956), war correspondent
George McCullagh (1905–1952), Canadian newspaper owner 1936–1952
James McCullagh (1809–1847), Irish mathematician
James Benjamin McCullagh (1854–1921), Anglican missionary in British Columbia
John H. McCullagh (1842–1893), American law enforcement officer in New York 
Noel McCullagh (born 1975), Irish journalist living in the Netherlands
Peter McCullagh (born 1952), Irish statistician from Northern Ireland
Sheila K. McCullagh MBE (born 1920), British author of children's books

See also
MacCulloch
McCulloch
McCollough
McCullough

Anglicised Scottish Gaelic-language surnames